Jill Walsh (born June 19, 1963) is an American Paralympic cyclist. At the 2016 Summer Paralympics, she won a silver medal in the women's time trial T1–2 category and the women's road race T1–2 category.

Personal life
Walsh was born in Rochester, New York on June 19, 1963. She is married to Greg Walsh and they have three children.

References 

1963 births
Living people
Sportspeople from Rochester, New York
American female cyclists
Cyclists at the 2016 Summer Paralympics
Cyclists at the 2020 Summer Paralympics
Medalists at the 2016 Summer Paralympics
Medalists at the 2020 Summer Paralympics
Paralympic silver medalists for the United States
Paralympic bronze medalists for the United States
Paralympic medalists in cycling
Paralympic cyclists of the United States
Medalists at the 2015 Parapan American Games
Medalists at the 2019 Parapan American Games
Binghamton University alumni
21st-century American women